Boston-Maine Airways was an American airline headquartered in Portsmouth, New Hampshire, United States. It operated scheduled commuter services as well as Boeing 727 jet flights under the Pan Am Clipper Connection name. Its main base was Pease International Airport.  Boston-Maine Airways ceased
all Pan Am flights on February 29, 2008.

History

Boston-Maine Airways was established in March 1999 and started operations in May 2000. It was founded as a feeder for the third incarnation of Pan American Airways and also flew leased BAe Jetstream 31 aircraft for Caesar's of Atlantic City, New Jersey. It was wholly owned by Pan Am Systems (formerly known as Guilford Transportation Industries), which owns the Pan Am brand.

Boston-Maine Airways operated six round-trips daily between Trenton–Mercer Airport in Ewing, New Jersey, and Hanscom Field in Bedford, Massachusetts. Boston-Maine Airways also operated one round-trip daily between Trenton–Mercer Airport and Pease International Airport in Portsmouth, New Hampshire.

Guilford ceased operations to Pan Am III on November 1, 2004, Boston-Maine Airways took over its operations, which resumed the Boeing 727 jet service under the Pan Am Clipper Connection brand on February 17, 2005.

In August 2005, a federal investigation into fraudulent financial data submitted by Boston-Maine Airways halted plans to expand its fleet and route system. At the same time, the airline pilots' union claimed that the airline was unfit to operate and urged the Department of Transportation to deny the airline's certification for expansion. The airline later announced that it was suspending service from September 6 to November 16, citing rising fuel costs and decreased levels of booking. In the middle of October 2005, the airline suspended Boeing 727 flights indefinitely from several airports that it served, including its home base in Portsmouth, New Hampshire.

However, by March 21, 2006, Pan Am Clipper Connection became the first announced non-charter service to connect to the then-growing Tunica Municipal Airport in Tunica, Mississippi.  The addition not only connected the carrier to a burgeoning casino destination but also aided efforts to bolster Tunica Municipal as a secondary airport to Memphis International Airport in nearby Memphis, Tennessee. Boston-Maine Airways' Pan Am Clipper Connection flew from Tunica Municipal Airport to Hartsfield-Jackson Atlanta International Airport three times per week; the service to Tunica had ended by October of the same year.

On August 1, 2006, Boston-Maine Airways announced that it would begin the Pan Am Clipper Connection service to Elmira-Corning Regional Airport in Elmira, New York. Company executives believed that Elmira was a perfect fit for the company, with its close proximity to Rochester, Ithaca, Binghamton, and Williamsport. The airline flew twice-daily routes to Bedford, Massachusetts, Trenton, New Jersey, and Baltimore-Washington International Thurgood Marshall Airport. Proposed future plans included possible flights to Orlando and Tampa, Florida, using the Boeing 727. However, by the fall of 2007, service to Elmira ceased.

Pan Am Clipper Connection began non-stop service to Baltimore-Washington International Thurgood Marshall Airport, Bedford, Massachusetts, and Portsmouth, New Hampshire from New Haven, Connecticut, on March 8, 2007, using 19 seat Jetstream 31 aircraft. Service was later discontinued in August 2007.

End of service
On February 1, 2008, the U.S. Department of Transportation (DOT) issued a Show Cause Order (Order 2008-2-3, DOT Docket Number DOT-OST-2000-7668), concluding that Boston-Maine's air carrier certificate should be revoked for three reasons: 1) lack of financial fitness, 2) lack of proper management oversight and 3) lack of "compliance disposition," or willingness to follow federal laws, rules and regulations.

The motion to revoke Boston-Maine's DOT air carrier certificate was brought by the Air Line Pilots Association. The DOT specifically cited the numerous instances where the airline's officials had failed to follow federal laws and regulations and had filed false financial data with the Department in its application for authority to fly large aircraft. The DOT concluded that it would have never granted the large aircraft authority had it known of the false information filed by Boston-Maine.

The DOT also rejected the carrier's arguments that it was not responsible for the Company's former General Counsel and Vice President's filing of such false information (Boston-Maine had asserted that this individual had acted alone, without the Company's knowledge or involvement).

On February 28, 2008, Boston-Maine Airways ended its Jetstream-operated scheduled passenger service. March 29, 2008, was the last 727 flight.

Beginning in July 2008, the company moved 8 of its planes to Concord Municipal Airport in New Hampshire, with the intent to keep them there until buyers took the planes. Parked on the ramp were six Jetstream 31s to be sold, but one Jetstream and a Cessna Citation I were placed in the corporate hangar operated by Concord Aviation Services.

Destinations
Boston-Maine Airways and the Pan Am Clipper Connection served the following destinations at various times during its existence:

Hartford (Bradley International Airport)
New Haven (Tweed New Haven Airport)

Fort Lauderdale (Fort Lauderdale International Airport)
Orlando (Orlando Sanford International Airport)
St. Petersburg/Clearwater (St. Pete-Clearwater International Airport)

Atlanta (Hartsfield-Jackson Atlanta International Airport)

MidAmerica St. Louis Airport

Gary/Chicago International Airport

Bangor International Airport

Baltimore (Baltimore-Washington International Airport)
Cumberland (Greater Cumberland Regional Airport)
Hagerstown (Hagerstown Regional Airport)

Bedford (Hanscom Field) Hub
Worcester Regional Airport

Tunica (Tunica Airport)

Portsmouth (Pease International Airport)

Trenton (Trenton–Mercer Airport)

Elmira (Elmira-Corning Regional Airport)
Ithaca (Ithaca Tompkins International Airport)
Newburgh (Stewart International Airport)

Columbus (John Glenn Columbus International Airport)

Allentown (Lehigh Valley International Airport)

San Juan (Luis Muñoz Marín International Airport)
Aguadilla (Rafael Hernández International Airport)

Santo Domingo (Las Americas International Airport)
Punta Cana (Punta Cana International Airport)

Fleet
The Boston-Maine Airways fleet consisted of the following aircraft (as of June 2007):

Boston-Maine Airways also formerly operated 2 CASA C-212-200 Aviocar.

See also
List of defunct airlines of the United States
Pan American Airways (1998–2004)

References

External links
"Pan Am Stops Flying" article from USA Today blog
Pan Am Services
 Pan Am Clipper Connection – Pan Am Railways

Pan Am
Defunct airlines of the United States
Airlines based in Massachusetts
Airlines established in 1999
Airlines disestablished in 2008
Defunct companies based in New Hampshire
Companies based in Portsmouth, New Hampshire
1999 establishments in New Hampshire
Defunct companies based in Massachusetts
Airlines based in New Hampshire
American companies established in 1999
American companies disestablished in 2008